John Edwin Thiel (born July 28, 1951) is Professor of Religious Studies at Fairfield University, Fairfield, Connecticut, U.S.A, where he has taught for 46 years.

Biography 
He received his B.A. from Fairfield University and his M.A. and Ph.D. from McMaster University.  He was Visiting Professor of Religious Studies, Yale University, in the spring semesters of 2000, 2019, and 2020.  Twice a recipient of fellowships from the National Endowment for the Humanities, he is the author of seven books. He writes in the field of Roman Catholic systematic theology. He served as president of the Catholic Theological Society of America in 2011-12, and as president of the American Theological Society in 2023-24

Books 
 God and World in Schleiermacher’s “Dialektik” and “Glaubenslehre” (Lang,1981)
 Imagination and Authority: Theological Authorship in the Modern Tradition (Fortress, 1991)
 Nonfoundationalism (Guides to Theological Inquiry) (Fortress, 1995)
 Senses of Tradition: Continuity and Development in Catholic Faith (Oxford, 2000)
 God, Evil, and Innocent Suffering: A Theological Reflection (Crossroad, 2002)
 Icons of Hope: The “Last Things” in Catholic Imagination (Notre Dame, 2013)
 Now and Forever: A Theological Aesthetics of Time (Notre Dame, 2023)

Awards 
2014 Alpha Sigma Nu Book Award, Theology Category

2014 Catholic Press Writers Association Book Award, Theology Category

References 

Fairfield University faculty
1951 births
Living people
21st-century American Roman Catholic theologians
McMaster University alumni
20th-century American Roman Catholic theologians
Fairfield University alumni